The 2019 PGA Tour Canada, titled as the 2019 Mackenzie Tour – PGA Tour Canada for sponsorship reasons, ran from May 23 to September 15 and consisted of 12 official golf tournaments. This was the 50th season of PGA Tour Canada (previously known as the Canadian Professional Golf Tour), and the seventh under the "PGA Tour Canada" name. It is also the fifth under the "Mackenzie Tour – PGA Tour Canada" name after Mackenzie Investments signed a six-year sponsorship deal.

Most events had a purse of $200,000 with first place earning $36,000. The final event of the season, the Canada Life Championship, had a purse of $225,000, with $40,500 going to the winner.

Schedule
The following table lists official events during the 2019 season.

Order of Merit
The Order of Merit was based on prize money won during the season, calculated in Canadian dollars. The top five players on the tour earned status to play on the 2020–21 Korn Ferry Tour.

Notes

References

External links
PGA Tour Canada official site

PGA Tour Canada
PGA Tour Canada